Alvin Yeo Khirn Hai  (28 March 1962 – 30 July 2022) was a Singaporean lawyer and politician.

Education
Yeo obtained his LLB from King's College London.

Career

Politics 
Yeo was a member of the People's Action Party. He served as Member of Parliament for Hong Kah GRC from 2006 to 2011, and for Chua Chu Kang GRC from 2011 to 2015.

At the 2015 general elections, he retired from politics, with Yee Chia Hsing succeeding in his seat. During his time as a Member of Parliament, he was Chairman of the Government Parliamentary Committee for Home Affairs and Law.

Legal 
Yeo was called to the bar in 1988. In 1992, Yeo founded the law firm, WongPartnership along with Dilhan Pillay Sandrasegara, Sundaresh Menon, and Wong Meng Meng. In 2000, Yeo was appointed as a senior counsel, making him the youngest lawyer to be named at that time.

On 31 July 2017, a complaint of possible overcharging by Yeo was made by three Court of Appeal judges to the Law Society. The judges were concerned by the amount charged and with the client's lack of mental capacity. The bill was later discounted by 32.5 percent. On 19 June 2019, a Law Society disciplinary tribunal dismissed the complaint. On 24 June 2019, the Law Society sought a review of the tribunal to the High Court of Singapore. On 8 January 2020, the High Court later ordered for another round of disciplinary tribunal hearing after having found that the original charges brought on by Law Society were not framed properly as they excluded considerations for the client's lack of mental capacity, and also that the original tribunal had decided that the mental capacity issues were not within the scope of complaint, contrary to some of the initial concerns raised by the Appeal judges. On objections from Yeo's lawyers that he would have to be investigated again, the High Court judge, Justice Valerie Thean, called the situation "unfortunate" and cited a 2008 parliamentary act that forbids any judicial review while disciplinary proceedings are ongoing, and thus the Court could only review after disclipinary proceedings completed.

Yeo was the chairman and senior partner of WongPartnership.

Business 
After Peter Lim owned Valencia CF in 2014, he appointed a new board of directors which included Yeo. Yeo held the directorship until his death in 2022.

Personal life
Yeo was married to Chan Hee Lien and had two children. He died on 30 July 2022 from cancer, aged 60.

Accolades 

 2017 –  Outstanding Contribution to the Legal Profession, Chambers Asia-Pacific

References

External links
Alvin Yeo's CV on WongPartnership's website

1962 births
2022 deaths
Deaths from cancer in Singapore
Alumni of King's College London
Members of the Parliament of Singapore
20th-century Singaporean lawyers
Singaporean people of Chinese descent
Singaporean Senior Counsel
People's Action Party politicians
Anglo-Chinese School alumni
Singaporean Christians